Plumatella fungosa (vernacular name: fungoid bryozoan) is a species of bryozoans from the family Plumatellidae.

It is generally found in the USA and Europe throughout streams in the North and mountain streams in the South. Plumatella fungosa is the dominant bryozoan in small mountain lakes at around 4000m altitude. It is commonly found in waters rich in humic colouration and with pH below 7, conditions which are often seen in waters surrounded by conifers.

References

Phylactolaemata
Freshwater animals of Europe
Freshwater animals of North America
Animals described in 1768
Taxa named by Peter Simon Pallas